Altay S.K. women's football,, is a Turkish women's football team as part of Altay S.K. based in İzmir. Founded in 2020, the black-white colored team play currently in the Turkish Women's Football Super League, the top tier of the women's football in Turkey.

History
The 1914-established İzmir-based Altay S.K. of the Süper Lig founded the women's football team in 2020 with the intention to join the Women's Third League. For preparations for the upcoming league season, the team trained at Kültürpark, an urbank park in the city center, since the club's facility with two fields of grass ground were not available to the women's team. The newly formed team ended their trainings because it became evident that they will not compete in the league as the Turkish Football Federation (TFF) suspended the Women's Third League in the 2020–21 season dure to ongoing COVID-19 pandemic in Turkey.

In September 2021, Altay S.K. applied to the TFF to be admitted to the Women's Super League, which was newly restructured from the Women's First League by the TFF to incorporate women's teams of major clubs of the men's Süper Lig. Upon approval, the team joined the Women's Super League.

For preparation to the 2020-21 Turkcell Super League season, the team played their first match, a friendly game, against the also new-formed team Galatasaray S.K.

The black-white colored team's chairman is Özgür Ekmekçioğlu. The is coached by Cenk Decdel, and the captain is Suzan Durmaz.

Stadium
The team play their home matches at Gaziemir District Stadıum.

Statistics

(1) : Season in progress

Current squad

Head coach:  Cenk Decdel

References

Altay S.K.
Women's football clubs in Turkey
Association football clubs established in 2020
2020 establishments in Turkey
Sports teams in İzmir